"You're Still the One" is a song recorded by Canadian singer-songwriter Shania Twain, released as the third single from her third studio album, Come On Over (1997). The song was written by Twain and Robert John "Mutt" Lange and produced by Lange. It was released in the US on January 27, 1998, and was Twain's first single to be released to pop radio.

"You're Still the One" peaked at number two on the US Billboard Hot 100 for nine weeks, becoming Twain's first top-ten hit in the US. Although it never topped the chart, the song is recognized as Twain's most successful crossover single and is one of her most successful singles at country radio. In Canada, the song peaked at number seven, and internationally, it reached number one in Australia for four weeks, number three in Ireland, and the top 10 in the Netherlands, New Zealand, and the United Kingdom.

"You're Still the One" was nominated for four Grammy Awards in 1999, winning two. It won Best Country Song and Best Female Country Vocal Performance and lost Record of the Year and Song of the Year to fellow Canadian, Celine Dion's "My Heart Will Go On". It was ranked number 46 on VH1's 100 Greatest Songs of the '90s.

Background
When Shania Twain and Robert John "Mutt" Lange became romantically involved in the mid 1990s, there was criticism of their relationship, namely claims that the age difference was extreme (he being 17 years older than her), and that Twain was solely using him to further her career. In essence, the critics did not expect their relationship to last. Twain disagreed with these criticisms and wanted to address them in public and this led to her writing "You're Still the One". In an interview with Top of the Pops in 1999, she mentioned that she and Lange never intended to write a song about themselves, but that they were simply influenced by the press criticism.

In her 2011 memoir From This Moment On, she described the process of writing the song: she and Lange each wrote separate ideas for songs for the album Come On Over and collated them together later. She stated that Lange singing the counter line as backing vocals in the song got her "feeling very excited" and led her to sing the chorus melody and both to come up with the title "You're Still the One". In this ode to the union between her and Lange, Twain expresses her happiness with their relationship, and satisfaction with proving the critics wrong.

Twain and Lange divorced twelve years later in 2010 after 17 years of marriage, due to an affair between Lange and her best friend. In her biography, Twain states that she continues to cherish the song in memory of her mother and of her stepfather. She believes that they were meant to be together and that, in spite of all the trials they have been through, her parents shared a very pure and true love.

Composition
According to the sheet music published at Musicnotes.com by Songs of Polygram International, Inc., the song is written in the key of E major following a chord progression of EE/GAB, and Twain's vocals span from G3 to B4. The song moves at a tempo of 67 beats per minute.

Critical reception
David Browne for Entertainment Weekly wrote, "...the moment when she briefly morphs herself into Janet Jackson during the intro of this country crossover ballad is the most subtle work Twain’s ever done. The way she blissfully intones ‘When I first saw you, I saw love/And the first time you touched me, I felt love” over a lazy drumbeat is a better approximation of Janet than the Jackson heard on the slack hit “I Get Lonely”; you can practically see Twain’s wet lips. Alas, the rest of the soapy “You’re Still the One” sounds like Gloria Estefan with a mandolin."

Blender ranked "You're Still the One" at number 69 in their list of Greatest Songs Since You Were Born. Dave Fawbert from ShortList described it as a "gorgeous song, with a timeless melody and kind of an unusual topic for a sad-sounding love song". Stacker placed the song at number 17 in their list of Best 90s pop songs in 2019. VH1 ranked it at number 46 in their list of 100 Greatest Songs of the '90s. In 2019, Rolling Stone ranked the song number one on its list of the 20 greatest Shania Twain songs.

Music video
The accompanying music video for "You're Still the One" was shot in Malibu and Los Angeles in blue-tinted monochrome and was directed by David Hogan. It was released on January 26, 1998, on CMT.

It depicts Twain on a beach at night and features model John Devoe, who later appeared in her video for "That Don't Impress Me Much". The video received heavy rotation, it was Twain's first video to be played on non-country-specific stations such as MTV, VH1, and MuchMusic. The video won awards at the Billboard Music Video Awards, VH1 Viewer's Choice Awards, and was nominated for an MTV Video Music Award. Two versions of the video were made, one with the 'Original Album Version', released to country channels, and the 'International Version' released to pop and international stations. The 'International Version' of the video is available on Twain's compilations Come On Over: Video Collection (1999) and The Platinum Collection (2001).

Duet video
Another music video was launched on August 1, 2014, with a duet with Brazilian singer Paula Fernandes in English and Portuguese. In the introduction to the video, Twain introduces Fernandes and praises: "She's beautiful and has an amazing voice is a big star in Brazil and I invited her to come sing with us tonight."

Chart performance
"You're Still the One" debuted at number 75 on the US Billboard Hot Country Singles & Tracks chart the week of January 24, 1998. The song spent 24 weeks on the chart, Twain's longest stay at the time, and climbed to number one on May 2, 1998, where it remained for one week. The single became Twain's sixth number-one single, seventh Top 10 single, and ninth Top 20 hit on the US Country chart. "You're Still the One" spent 22 weeks atop the Country Singles Sales chart and 2 weeks at number one on the Hot Country Recurrents chart.

At adult contemporary radio, "You're Still the One" debuted number 26, for the week ending February 14, 1998. The single spent 81 weeks on the chart and climbed to number one on June 27, 1998, where it remained for eight non-consecutive weeks. As it was Twain's first release to this format, "You're Still the One" was her first number one, Top 10, and Top 20 single. It also topped the Adult Contemporary Recurrents chart for two weeks, and remained on the chart for 166 weeks.

"You're Still the One" is also Twain's most successful single on the Billboard Hot 100. It debuted at number 51 on February 14, 1998. It spent 42 weeks on the chart and peaked at number two for nine non-consecutive weeks starting May 2, 1998, making it one of the longest runs at number 2 of any song in the history of the Billboard Hot 100. Next's "Too Close" and Brandy and Monica's "The Boy Is Mine" both held the number one spot while "You're Still the One" stalled at number two due to depleted stock of physical singles.

The physical commercial single of "You're Still the One" has sold over two million copies in America. As a result, the single has been certified 2× platinum by the RIAA for shipments of at least 2,000,000 copies.

Internationally, "You're Still the One" became Twain's first Top 10 single in the United Kingdom. It debuted at number 10, its peak, on February 28, 1998. It remained on the chart for 10 weeks. In Australia, it became her first, and to date, only number one, staying at the top spot for four weeks in May 1998. It also reached the Top 10 in Ireland, the Netherlands, and New Zealand.

Awards
"You're Still the One" was both a commercial and critical success, winning many awards over three years. The song was nominated for four Grammy Awards in 1999, winning two. It won Best Country Song and Best Female Country Vocal Performance and lost Record of the Year and Song of the Year to Celine Dion's "My Heart Will Go On". Some of the other notable wins include; the Best Selling Country Single at the 1998 Billboard Music Awards, Single of the Year at the 1998 Canadian Country Music Awards, Song of the Year at the 1999 BMI Country Songwriter Awards and BMI Pop Songwriter Awards. "You're Still the One" also notable won Song of the Year at the 1999 BMI Country Songwriter Awards and BMI Pop Songwriter Awards. In 2006 BMI announced the song surpassed six million plays in the US.

The video also won a set of awards including the Best Country Video Award at the 1998 Billboard Music Video Awards, Video of the Year at the 1998 CMT Latin America Awards, and the Viewer's Choice Award for Sexiest Video at the 1998 VH1 Viewer's Choice Awards. The Video was also nominated for Best Female Video at the 1998 MTV Video Music Awards, making Twain the first female country artist to ever be nominated for an MTV Video Music Award.

Track listings

 Canadian CD single
 "You're Still the One" (radio edit with intro) – 3:36
 "You're Still the One" (album version) – 3:32
 "Don't Be Stupid (You Know I Love You)" (Dance Mix) – 4:45

 US CD, 7-inch, and cassette single
 "You're Still the One" (radio edit with intro) – 3:34
 "Don't Be Stupid (You Know I Love You)" (remix) – 3:37

 US maxi-CD single
 "You're Still the One" (Soul Solution radio mix) – 4:03
 "You're Still the One" (Soul Solution extended club mix) – 8:42
 "You're Still the One" (Kano Dub) – 7:46
 "You're Still the One" (Soul Solution Percapella Dance Mix) – 3:34
 "You're Still the One" (radio edit with intro) – 3:34

 UK and Australian CD single
 "You're Still the One" (radio edit without intro/single version) – 3:19
 "(If You're Not in It for Love) I'm Outta Here!" (Mutt Lange Mix) – 4:21
 "You Win My Love" (Mutt Lange Mix) – 3:54
 "You're Still the One" (radio edit with intro/LP version) – 3:34

 UK cassette single and European CD single
 "You're Still the One" (radio edit without intro/single version) – 3:19
 "(If You're Not in It for Love) I'm Outta Here!" (Mutt Lange Mix) – 4:21

 French limited-edition CD single
 "You're Still the One" (single version) – 3:19
 "You're Still the One" (Soul Solution dance mix) – 4:03
 "You're Still the One" (video) – 3:19
 "That Don't Impress Me Much" (video) – 3:38

Credits and personnel
Credits are taken from the Come On Over album booklet.

Studio
 Recorded and mastered at Masterfonics (Nashville, Tennessee)

Personnel

 Shania Twain – writing, vocals, background vocals
 Robert John "Mutt" Lange – writing, background vocals, production
 Biff Watson – guitars
 Dann Huff – guitars, guitar textures, six-string bass, talk box
 Bruce Bouton – pedal steel guitar, steel solo
 Eric Silver – mandolin
 Joe Chemay – electric and fretless bass
 John Jarvis – acoustic piano
 John Hobbs – organ
 Paul Leim – drums
 Mike Shipley – mixing
 Olle Romo – programming, Pro Tools, sequencing, editing
 Glenn Meadows – mastering

Charts

Weekly charts

Year-end charts

Decade-end charts

Certifications

Release history

References

1990s ballads
1997 songs
1998 singles
Black-and-white music videos
Canadian Country Music Association Single of the Year singles
Country ballads
Mercury Records singles
Mercury Nashville singles
Music videos directed by David Hogan
Number-one singles in Australia
Shania Twain songs
Song recordings produced by Robert John "Mutt" Lange
Songs written by Robert John "Mutt" Lange
Songs written by Shania Twain